Ontario Provincial Police Headquarters (Lincoln M. Alexander Building) is the main administration office for the Ontario Provincial Police. The building is located at 777 Memorial Avenue in Orillia, Ontario. It was completed in 1995 and is the first building constructed specifically to house the OPP headquarters.

Ontario Provincial Police Museum
The building has a small gift shop and museum on the ground floor which are open to the public, but all other sections are off limits. The museum displays vehicles, uniforms and other artifacts relating to the OPP since 1909.

Historical headquarters buildings from 1922 to 1995
The current building opened in 1995 and is the latest of several buildings to house the OPP headquarters. Previous locations have included:
 1922–?: Queen's Park in Toronto, 2nd floor offices
 1973–1990s: Workmen's Compensation Board Building at 90 Harbour Street in Toronto
 1990s–1995: Tudhope Building in Orillia, now used by Orillia City Hall and Lakehead University

Gallery of former headquarters

References

Buildings and structures in Orillia
Office buildings completed in 1995
Ontario Provincial Police